Bem-Vindos a Beirais is a Portuguese television series broadcast by RTP. It has three seasons, with a fourth scheduled to air. The first season had 100 episodes and started airing on 13 May 2013 on RTP1. The second season premiered on 4 November 2013 and had 80 episodes. The third season premiered on 25 February 2014.

Plot
The series is set in Beirais, a fictional village located in the Leiria District. The show is in fact filmed in Carvalhal, Bombarral, some 350 km away from its fictional location.

Before he had a heart attack, Diogo Almada lived in Lisbon. He meets Henrique and sold his agricultural business to Diogo and moved to Beirais.

Cast
Pêpê Rapazote
Oceana Basílio
Sandra Santos
Margarida Cardeal
Dinarte Branco
Inês Faria
Susana Mendes
Luísa Ortigoso
Lúcia Moniz
Luís Aleluia
Miguel Dias
Heitor Lourenço
Carlos Santos
Carla Chambel
Tomás Alves
José Boavida†
Noémia Costa
Henriqueta Maia

† late actor

References

External links

2013 Portuguese television series debuts
Rádio e Televisão de Portugal original programming
Television series set in Vila Real District
2010s Portuguese television series